The 1937 New Mexico A&M Aggies football team was an American football team that represented New Mexico College of Agriculture and Mechanical Arts (now known as New Mexico State University) as a member of the Border Conference during the 1937 college football season.  In their ninth year under head coach Jerry Hines, the Aggies compiled a 7–2 record (4–1 against conference opponents), finished second in the conference, and outscored all opponents by a total of 128 to 60. The team played its five home games at Quesenberry Field in Las Cruces, New Mexico.

Schedule

References

New Mexico AandM
New Mexico State Aggies football seasons
New Mexico AandM Aggies football